Church Cottage Museum is a 16th-century cottage in Broughton, City of Preston, Lancashire, England.

The cottage is grade II listed and is operated as a small museum, open on Sunday afternoons.

The cottage was built in the 16th century and over time was used as an inn and a school room as well as a residence.  After the death of its last tenant in 1986 the building became neglected, but it was restored after local fundraising which included a grant from  British Aerospace and was opened as a museum by Princess Alexandra in 1995.

References

Museums in the City of Preston
Grade II listed buildings in Lancashire
Grade II listed houses
Broughton, Lancashire
Grade II listed museum buildings